Shahana K. Hanif (born February 5, 1991) is an American politician who is a member of the New York City Council for the 39th district, which covers Park Slope and other neighborhoods in central Brooklyn.

Early life
Hanif was born and raised in Kensington, Brooklyn, New York, to immigrant parents from Bangladesh. She graduated from Bishop Kearney High School and went on to receive her B.A. from Brooklyn College.

At age 17, Hanif was diagnosed with lupus, an incurable and potentially fatal autoimmune disease. Hanif has cited her experience with the chronic illness, which forced her to navigate the healthcare system for years despite having inadequate health insurance, as her first window into disability justice and community organizing.

Career
Hanif began working for Councilman Brad Lander in 2017, first as his liaison to the Bangladeshi community and eventually as his director of organizing and community engagement. During her time working for Lander, Hanif helped a Bangladeshi woman escape a forced marriage, which she cited as an important factor in her eventual decision to run for the New York City Council herself.

New York City Council
In late 2019, with her boss Lander facing term limits, Hanif announced her intention to run for the City Council's 39th district in 2021. The district, which had previously been represented by Mayor Bill de Blasio and which was soon to promote Lander to the City Comptroller's office, was described as a "political launching pad" by Gotham Gazette.

Hanif faced six other candidates in the June 2021 Democratic primary, most notable among them activist Brandon West. Hanif and West both ran on similar left-wing policy platforms, but West received the support of the Democratic Socialists of America and other socialist elected officials, while Hanif was backed by the Working Families Party and other more traditional progressive organizations; Congresswoman Alexandria Ocasio-Cortez, meanwhile, issued an unusual dual endorsement of both candidates.

On election night, Hanif held a 32-23% advantage over West. When absentee ballots and ranked-choice votes were counted two weeks later, Hanif emerged with a 57-43% lead, and declared victory on July 3. She faced minimal opposition in the November general election, and handily won the race, making her the first Muslim woman and the first Bangladeshi American elected to the New York City Council and the first woman to represent the 39th district. The final tally showed that she had 89% of the vote.

References

Living people
1991 births
Democratic Socialists of America politicians from New York
Politicians from Brooklyn
Brooklyn College alumni
New York (state) Democrats
American people of Bangladeshi descent
Asian-American people in New York (state) politics
American feminists
Muslim socialists
New York (state) socialists
People from Sunset Park, Brooklyn
Socialist feminists
21st-century American women politicians
People with lupus
21st-century American politicians
Women New York City Council members
New York City Council members
Asian-American New York City Council members